Sudety Wałbrzyskie Landscape Park (Park Krajobrazowy Sudetów Wałbrzyskich) is a protected area (Landscape Park) in south-western Poland, established in 1998, covering an area of .

The park lies within Lower Silesian Voivodeship, in Wałbrzych County (Gmina Czarny Bór, Gmina Głuszyca, Gmina Mieroszów).

There are no nature reserves or ecological lands in the park, but there are a dozen or so natural monuments, mainly protecting unique rock formations:

 Czerwone Skałki
 Małpia Skała
 Stożek Wielki
 Szczeliny Wiatrowe
 Zamkowa Góra

References 

Landscape parks in Poland
Parks in Lower Silesian Voivodeship